Yelapa is a small beach town in Cabo Corrientes, Jalisco, Mexico.  The village lies in the southernmost cove of Bahía de Banderas (Bay of the Flags).

Etymology 

Yelapa’s name comes from an indigenous saying meaning "where two rivers meet the sea".

Climate 

Yelapa's climate is typical tropical wet and dry (Köppen climate classification Aw), with a marked dry season in the winter. The high temperature and variations in humidity can make July through September nearly intolerable. It has pronounced wet and dry seasonal variation, with sudden monsoon-like rains from July through September, normally for a few hours in the evenings.

The rainy season extends from mid June through mid October, with most of the rain between July and September. August is the city's wettest month, with an average of 14 days with significant precipitation. Even during the rainy season precipitation tends to be concentrated in large rainstorms. Occasional tropical storms will bring thunderstorms to the city in November, though the month is typically dry. February, March and April are the months with the least cloud cover.
Prevailing winds are from the southwest, and most weather systems approaching Yelapa and surrounding areas are consequently weakened as they pass over Cabo Corriente. Thus even during the rainy season Yelapa's weather tends to be mild compared to other areas along the Mexican Pacific coast.

Hurricanes seldom strike Yelapa.

See also 

Raicilla
Tourism in Mexico

References

External links 
 
Sunset Magazine article: Disappear to Yelapa

Beaches of Jalisco
Municipalities of Jalisco
Port cities and towns on the Mexican Pacific coast
Resorts in Mexico